BD1052 or N-[2-(3,4-dichlorophenyl)ethyl]-N-2-propen-1-yl-1-pyrrolidineethanamine is a selective sigma receptor agonist, with a reported binding affinity of Ki = 2 ± 0.5 nM for the sigma-1 receptor and 30 times selectivity over the sigma-2 receptor.

Consistent with other reported sigma receptor agonists, pretreating Swiss Webster mice with BD1052 significantly increases the behavioral toxicity of cocaine.

See also
 BD1008
 BD1031
 LR132

References

Sigma agonists
Chloroarenes
Pyrrolidines
Allyl compounds